Sokolnice is a municipality and village in Brno-Country District in the South Moravian Region of the Czech Republic. It has about 2,300 inhabitants.

History
The first written mention of Sokolnice is from 1408.

Sokolnice was the scene of heavy fighting during the Battle of Austerlitz on 2 December 1805. Held by French troops led by Claude Legrand and Pierre Margaron, it was attacked by two Russian columns under the command of Louis Alexandre Andrault de Langeron and I. Przybyszewski. The Russians captured Sokolnice but were soon enveloped by French troops who had broken through farther north. A large part of Przybyszewski's column surrendered, while Langeron's troops suffered serious losses.

References

Villages in Brno-Country District